Faraday is a locality situated  on the Calder Highway,  north west of Melbourne in Victoria, Australia.

History
The Post Office opened on 1 April 1867, but was closed in 1880, postal services being provided from nearby Harcourt.

The former Faraday Primary School is a single-room building constructed in 1869 from local granite. It opened as a Common School and became a State School in 1873. In October 1972, six pupils and their teacher were kidnapped from the school and held for a ransom of one million dollars. All later escaped unharmed . The school was closed in 1976, and the building is listed on the Victorian Heritage Register.

References